Rasmus Steenberg Christiansen (born 6 October 1989) is a Danish professional footballer who plays as a defender Valur in the Icelandic Úrvalsdeild karla. He won the Icelandic championship in 2017 and 2018 with Valur.

Career
Christiansen started his senior team career with Lyngby BK 2007 before moving to ÍBV in 2010. After three seasons with ÍBV, he left the club and signed with Ull/Kisa.

He returned to Iceland in 2015, signing with Knattspyrnufélag Reykjavíkur. After one season with KR, he joined Valur in December 2015. With Valur, helped the team win the Icelandic Cup in 2016 and the Icelandic championship in 2017 and 2018, although the later year, he missed the majority of the season due to a broken leg. After returning from his injury, he was loaned to Fjölnir ahead of the 2019 season in the 1. deild karla. With Christiansen, Fjölnir finished second in the league, achieving promotion to the Úrvalsdeild karla. After the season, he was selected the Player of the Year by the league's managers and team captains. Despite heavy interest from Fjölnir to keep him, he signed a 2-year contract extension with Valur in October 2019.

Titles
Úrvalsdeild karla: 2017, 2018, 2020 
Icelandic Cup: 2016
Icelandic League Cup: 2018
Icelandic Super Cup: 2016, 2017, 2018

References

External links

1989 births
Living people
Danish men's footballers
Expatriate footballers in Iceland
Rasmus Christiansen
Rasmus Christiansen
Rasmus Christiansen
Rasmus Christiansen
Rasmus Christiansen
Association football central defenders